John Adam may refer to:

 John Adam (architect) (1721–1792), Scottish architect
 John Adam (silversmith) (1774–1848), silversmith and painter in Virginia
 John Adam (administrator) (1779–1825), British administrator in India
 John Adam (legislator) (1860–?), Wisconsin populist legislator from Milwaukee
 John Adam (sailor), British sailor, won silver medal at 1908 Summer Olympics
 John A. Adam (journalist) (born 1949), American reporter
 John A. Adam (mathematician), British-American applied mathematician
 John Adam (rugby league) (born 1956), Australian rugby league player
 John Adam (actor) (born 1960s), Australian television and theatre actor
 John Adam (MP) for New Romney
 John Adam (hoax), the name given by Islamic militants to a U.S. soldier they claimed to have captured
 John J. Adam (1807–1888), Scottish-American teacher, businessman, and politician
 John Sheddon Adam (born 1935), Australian painter and art teacher

See also
 John Adams (disambiguation)
 Jonathan Adams (disambiguation)